(), also known as , is generic term which refers to a type of traditional Chinese decorative piece of fabric, which acts as a knee covering, in . The  originated in China where it originated from the primitive clothing of the ancient; since then, it continued to be worn by both men and women, and eventually became part of the Chinese ceremonial attire. The  was later introduced in Korea during Goryeo and Joseon by the Ming dynasty, along with many garments for royalties.

History 

The  originated from primitive clothing back when animal hides were used to cover the abdomen and the genitals.

In the Ming dynasty, the became part of the official clothing.

Construction and design 
The  is a length of fabric which is typically long enough to reach the kneel-level and cover the front legs when attached to the waist of its wearer.

Usage

Male clothing attire 

Female clothing attire 

A  was also worn with the  worn by Chinese empresses; the  worn in the  hanged in front of the garment and had the same colour as the bottom colour as the lower skirt.

Gallery

See also 

 Hanfu
 List of Hanfu
 Mianfu

References 

Chinese traditional clothing